Barocho railway station 
(Sindhi: ٻاروچو باغ ريلوي اسٽيشن) is  located in Sindh, Pakistan.

See also
 List of railway stations in Pakistan
 Pakistan Railways

References

External links

Railway stations in Jamshoro District